Crop protection is the science and practice of managing plant diseases, weeds, and other pests (both vertebrate and invertebrate) that damage crops and forestry. Crops include field crops (maize, wheat, rice, etc.), vegetable crops (potatoes, cabbages, etc.), and fruits. The crops in the field are exposed to many factors. The crop plants may be damaged by insects, birds, rodents, bacteria, etc. Crop protection encompasses:
All practical aspects of pest, disease, and weed control, including the following topics:
Control of animal pests of world crops. 
Control of diseases of crop plants caused by microorganisms. 
Control of weeds and integrated management.
Economic considerations.
Using pest resistant varieties of crop.

See also 
 CAB International
 CropLife International
 Integrated pest management
 Vive Crop Protection